The University/Parks Trail is a rail trail in metropolitan area of Toledo, Ohio, United States. The trail is open to walkers, bikers, joggers and in-line skaters.

Location

Western terminus: Sylvania, intersection with Silica Road 
Eastern terminus: University of Toledo, intersection with East Rocket Drive

Trail route
The trail runs over the right-of-way of the late Toledo, Angola and Western Railroad. Starting at the University of Toledo, the trail runs  to Silica Road in Sylvania, Ohio. The trail crosses roads seven times, twice over rail bridge. The other crosses form intersections, two of which have stop lights. The park has neighborhood access, and has an entrance to Wildwood Preserve Metropark. From King Road, one can travel north to Milton Olander Park and east to Westfield Franklin Park. From the University of Toledo, one can travel northeast to Ottawa Park.

History
The path the trail follows was originally the tracks of the Toledo, Angola and Western Railroad, laid in 1902. When the railroad abandoned their right of way, five public agencies joined to create the trail. The trail was completed with a $1.3 million federal grant, given through the Ohio Department of Transportation. The trail officially opened to public use in September 1995, although many had been enjoying the paved parts of the path as construction was going on elsewhere on the path. In July 2019 a .6 mile extension was opened from King Road to Silica Road.

Involved public agencies

Five public agencies were involved in the creation of the trail; they are:

Lucas County Commissioners and Engineer's Office
City of Toledo
Metroparks of the Toledo Area
Sylvania Area Joint Recreation District
The University of Toledo

See also
Metroparks of the Toledo Area
Rails to trails

References

Rail trails in Ohio
Parks in Toledo, Ohio
Protected areas of Lucas County, Ohio
Metroparks Toledo